Pan-Americana is a 1945 American romantic comedy film produced and directed by John H. Auer, from a screenplay by Lawrence Kimble, based on a story by Auer and Frederick Kohner. RKO released the film on March 22, 1945, and the picture stars Phillip Terry, Audrey Long, Robert Benchley, Eve Arden, Ernest Truex, Marc Cramer, and Jane Greer (uncredited) in her feature film debut.  The film was an example of the Good Neighbor policy encouraging Americans to travel to South America for holidays and the last of a film genre.

Premise
American journalist Jo Anne Benson travels with photographer Dan Jordan to a trip to Mexico, Cuba and Brazil for a magazine story encountering a variety of South American entertainers.

Cast
Phillip Terry ... 	Dan Jordan
Audrey Long ... 	Jo Anne Benson
Robert Benchley 	... Charlie Corker
Eve Arden 	... Helen 'Hoppy' Hopkins
Ernest Truex ... 	Uncle Rudy
 Marc Cramer 	... Gerold 'Jerry' Bruce
Lita Baron	... Lupita (as Isabelita)
 Rosario and Antoni 
Miguelito Valdés 
Harold Liebman and Lola Liebman 
Louise Burnette 
 Chinita 
Chuy Castillion 	
Chuy Reyes and His Orchestra
Nestor Amaral and His Samba Band 
Rita Corday ... 	Pan-American Girl 
Jane Greer ... Miss Downing 
Julian Rivero 	... Pablo the Driver-Tour Guide

Soundtrack
 Rumba Matumba Music by Bobby CollazoLyrics by Mort Greene
 GuadalajaraWritten by Pepe Guízar
 BabalúWritten by Margarita Lecuona
 Negra LeonoWritten by Antonio Fernandez
 La morena de mi coplaWritten by Carlos Castellanos Gómez
 Stars in Your EyesMusic by Gabriel RuizLyrics by Ricardo López MéndezEnglish Lyrics by Mort Greene
 No Tabuleiro da BaianaWritten by Ary BarrosoEnglish Lyrics by Mort Greene

References

External links
 

1945 films
RKO Pictures films
American black-and-white films
1945 romantic comedy films
American romantic comedy films
1945 musical comedy films
Films set in South America
1940s American films